Shewanella frigidimarina is a species of bacteria, notable for being an Antarctic species with the ability to produce eicosapentaenoic acid. It grows anaerobically by dissimilatory Fe (III) reduction. Its cells are motile and rod shaped. ACAM 591 is its type strain.

References

Further reading
Stapleton Jr, R. D., and V. P. Singh, eds. Biotransformations: Bioremediation Technology for Health and Environmental Protection: Bioremediation Technology for Health and Environmental Protection. Vol. 36. Access Online via Elsevier, 2002.

External links
Type strain of Shewanella frigidimarina at BacDive -  the Bacterial Diversity Metadatabase

Alteromonadales
Bacteria described in 1997